The Exhibition of the Fascist Revolution (Mostra della Rivoluzione Fascista) was a show held in Rome at the Palazzo delle Esposizioni from  1932 to 1934. Opened by Benito Mussolini on 28 October 1932, it had 4 million visitors.

Its director and designer was Dino Alfieri, with the cooperation of Luigi Freddi and Cipriano Efisio Oppo.  Seen as a great success, it was repeated in 1937 and 1942, though these two repeats did not have the same public success.

Telling the evolution of Italian history from 1914 to the March on Rome, it was never conceived as an objective representation of the facts or as being solely based on the exhibiting of historic documents, but as a work of Fascist propaganda to influence and involve the audience emotionally.  For this reason not only historians were called in to assist in the exhibition, but also exponents of various artistic currents of the era, such as Mario Sironi, Enrico Prampolini, Gerardo Dottori, Adalberto Libera and Giuseppe Terragni.

References

Bibliography
  Alfieri, Dino and Luigi Freddi, (editors), Mostra della Rivoluzione Fascista, National Fascist Party, Rome, 1933.
  Alfieri, Dino and Luigi Freddi, (editors), Exhibition of the Fascist Revolution. 1st Decennial of the March on Rome, National Fascist Party, Rome, 1933.
  Jeffrey T. Schnapp, Anno X - La mostra della Rivoluzione fascista del 1932, Istituti Editoriali e Poligrafici Internazionali, Pisa, 2003
  Antonella Russo, Il fascismo in mostra, Editori Riuniti, Rome, 1999
  Alessandra Capanna, Mostra della Rivoluzione fascista, Testo & Immagine, Turin, 2004
  Paola S. Salvatori, La seconda Mostra della Rivoluzione fascista, in "Clio", XXXIX, 3, 2003, pp. 439–459.
 Marla S. Stone, The Patron State, Culture & Politics in Fascist Italy (Princeton: Princeton U. Press, 1998).
 Maddalena Carli, Immagini, rivoluzioni, frontiere. Sguardi francesi sulla Mostra della rivoluzione fascista del 1932, in Vers une Europe latine. Acteurs et enjeux des échanges culturels entre la France et l'Italie fasciste, a cura di Catherine Fraixe, Lucia Piccioni e Christophe Poupault, Paris, Peter Lang/INHA, 2014, pp.  97-113
 Maddalena Carli, Par la volonté du Chef et par l'oeuvre du Parti. Le mythe du chef dans le Guide Historique de l'Exposition de la Révolution Fasciste, «Cahiers du Centre de Recherches Historiques», Ecole des Hautes Etudes en Sciences Sociales (EHESS) - Paris, Dossier “Regards sur l'histoire culturelle”, n. 31, avril 2003, pp. 93-108

Italian Fascism
Fascist propaganda
Modern history of Italy
1930s in Rome
1932 in Italy